The Concerts royaux (singular: Concert royal; English: Royal Concerts) are chamber music suites by François Couperin written for the court of Louis XIV. Each consists of a prelude and a succession of dances in the order allemande, sarabande or courante, followed by others – but the suites are intended for listening more than dancing.

Four were produced in 1714 and published in 1722. Another ten followed in 1724, now called Nouveaux concerts, ou les Goûts réunis (referring to the "reunited" French and Italian musical tastes). Neither of the two sets has fixed instrumentation: each suite can be played by solo harpsichord or an ensemble with a bass and three melody instruments, such as a violin, a viol, and an oboe or flute. (This freedom is found also in works by Marin Marais and Gaspard Le Roux.) The first and more frequently played of the sets is as follows:

Premier concert in G Major
Prélude
Allemande
Sarabande
Gavotte
Gigue
Menuet en trio
Deuxième concert in D Major
Prélude
Allemande fuguée
Air tendre
Air contrefugué
Echos
Troisième concert in A Major
Prélude
Allemande
Courante
Sarabande grave
Gavotte
Musette
Chaconne légère
Quatrième concert in E Minor
Prélude
Allemande
Courante française
Courante à l'italienne
Sarabande
Rigaudon
Forlane

External links
The original version, as published by François Couperin at the end of Troisième Livre de Clavecin (1722): :http://icking-music-archive.org/ByComposer/Couperin.php

Compositions by François Couperin
Suites (music)
1715 compositions